Osborne Perry Anderson (July 27, 1830 – December 11, 1872) was an African-American abolitionist and the only surviving African-American member of John Brown's raid on Harpers Ferry. He became a soldier in the Union Army during the American Civil War.

Early life

In 1830 Anderson was born a free African American in West Fallow Field Township, Chester County, Pennsylvania. He completed basic schooling and later attended Oberlin College in Ohio, after which he moved to Chatham in Canada West (now Ontario) in 1850 and opened shop as a printer. This skill served him later as an abolitionist.

The same year, he was a member of the Chatham Vigilance Committee that sought to prevent former slaves from being returned to the United States and brought back into slavery, such as the case of Sylvanus Demarest.

John Brown and the raid on Harpers Ferry

In May 1858, Anderson met John Brown and learned of the revolution that he was planning at a meeting in Chatham. Because of his writing skills Anderson was appointed as the recording secretary at several of the meetings and was eventually promoted to a member of Brown’s provisional congress.

During the raid, Col. Lewis Washington, great grand-nephew of George Washington, was taken hostage by the raiders, and surrendered to Anderson the sword of Frederick the Great and pistols presented by General Lafayette to General Washington. John Brown later brandished the sword while commanding his men at Harpers Ferry.

During the raid on Harpers Ferry Anderson was stationed with Albert Hazlett, and once it became apparent to them that the raid was a failure they both retreated to Pennsylvania.  Hazlett was later captured and hanged.

A Voice from Harper's Ferry

After the failed raid, Anderson went on to publish an account of the events, titled A Voice From Harper’s Ferry. The book describes the conditions that were present at the Harpers Ferry raid, including the training, the supplies that were available, and the events that led up to and followed the raid. In it, he says he was the only surviving person who was with Brown during the entire raid.

Though Anderson did not name the friends who aided his escape in his account, later analysis concluded that William C. Goodridge, a conductor on the Underground Railroad, hid him in York, Pennsylvania, then sent him by rail to Philadelphia. Anderson proceeded from there to Canada.

Later life
Upon the start of the Civil War Anderson became a noncommissioned officer of the Union Army. In October of 1872, "the colored citizens of Philadelphia" took up a collection of $69 to help him; in thanking them on October 20, he indicates that his health is poor ("Should Providence spare my life..."), and the newspaper described him as in "feeble health" and "on his way to the South". In Washington D.C. two collections produced over $150.
Within a week he died, in Washington, from tuberculosis and lack of care.  He was interred at Columbian Harmony Cemetery. All the bodies from that cemetery were moved to National Harmony Memorial Park in Landover, Maryland. The exact location of his remains in the cemetery is unknown as most of the reburials were in the nature of a mass grave. His gravestone marker, if there was one, was sold with the others as scrap and probably ended up as "rip-rap" securing the Potamac shoreline of Stuart Plantation. There is a more recent memorial, but it is almost certainly not located over his remains.

Works

See also
 John Brown's raiders

Legacy
 The Journals of Osborne P. Anderson, a play by Ted Lange, was produced in Winston-Salem, North Carolina, in 2015.

References

Further reading

External links

 
 

African-American abolitionists
African Americans in the American Civil War
1830 births
1871 deaths
Burials at Columbian Harmony Cemetery
Participants in John Brown's raid on Harpers Ferry
Oberlin College alumni
Canadian printers
People from Chester County, Pennsylvania